Kwan Chia, often called Guangjia, was a 1,296-ton composite cruiser, often called a corvette, in service with the Imperial Chinese Guangdong Fleet. Total officers and crew were 180.

Design
Kwan Chia was built at the Foochow Navy Yard in 1887. Her hull was composite-built, with wooden planking over an iron frame. By the time she was completed she was obsolete, but her armament was fairly modern, consisting of four 4.7-inch (120 mm) and one 5.9-inch (150 mm) Krupp breech-loading guns. Two of her 4.7-inch guns were on sponsons on either side of the ship near the bow, the other two were further aft on pivot mounts inboard, and the 5.9-inch gun was on the stern.

Naval service
She was built for the Guangdong Fleet, one of the Imperial Chinese Navy's four regional fleets. Nothing is known of her early career, but she along with several other ships of the Guangdong Fleet was present at the 1894 Battle of the Yalu River during the First Sino-Japanese War, on 17 September 1894. She made up a fighting pair with the Beiyang Fleet cruiser . She was probably destroyed by the Japanese fast cruiser squadron after Jiyuan withdrew with damage, or possibly she steamed back to Weihaiwei as soon as possible.

References
 Chesneau, Roger and Eugene M. Kolesnik (editors), All The World's Fighting Ships 1860-1905, Conway Maritime Press, 1979 reprinted 2002, 
 Wright, Richard N. J., The Chinese Steam Navy 1862-1945, Chatham Publishing, London, 2000, 

Ships of the Beiyang Fleet
First Sino-Japanese War naval ships of China
Naval ships of China